Suddenly Naked is a 2001 drama film directed by Anne Wheeler, written by Elyse Friedman, and starring Wendy Crewson and Peter Coyote.

Plot
Jackie York (Wendy Crewson) is a famous novelist with a secret, she is suffering from writer's block and is unable to write her much-anticipated novel. After being used and then dumped by a wannabe movie director, Jackie can't get back to work. So Jackie concocts a mess of lies to cover up her loneliness and to protect her secret. Jackie then meets a man named Patrick McKeating (Joe Cobden), a writer who opens her up to new possibilities. However, Patrick is nearly 20 years younger than Jackie. Jackie gets a lesson in true love and must decide what really matters in life.

Cast
 Wendy Crewson as Jackie York
 Peter Coyote as Lionel
 Emmanuelle Vaugier as Lupe Martinez
 Joe Cobden as Patrick McKeating
 Jud Tylor as Crystal
 Jennifer Carmichael as "Rainbow"
 Eliza Murbach as Kelly
 Dan Joffre as Fan
 Camille Mitchell as Sasha
 Michael Shanks as Danny Blair
 Ron Selmour as Security Guard

Awards and nominations
2002 Anne Wheeler and Gavin Wilding won Best Feature Length Drama at the Leo Awards
2002 Lara Mazur won Best Picture Editing in a Feature Length Drama at the Leo Awards
2002 Anne Wheeler won Feature Length Drama: Best Director at the Leo Awards
2002 Chris Ainscough won Feature Length Drama: Best Musical Score at the Leo Awards
2003 Lara Mazur won Best Achievement in Editing at the Genie Awards
2003 Gavin Wilding was nominated for "Best Motion Picture" at the Genie Awards
2003 Anne Wheeler was nominated for "Best Achievement in Directing" at the Genie Awards
2003 Chris Ainscough was nominated for "Best Achievement in Music – Original Score" at the Genie Awards
2003 Laura Doyle was nominated for "Best Achievement in Music – Original Song" for the song "Your Love" at the Genie Awards

External links

 
 

2001 films
English-language Canadian films
2000s English-language films
Canadian drama films
Films about writers
Films directed by Anne Wheeler
2001 drama films
2000s Canadian films